Starhops is 1978 exploitation film directed by Barbara Peeters. It was based on a script by Stephanie Rothman, writing under a pseudonym, and was edited by Steve Zaillian, who later became an Oscar-winning screenwriter.

Premise
Three carhops team up to save their cash-strapped Venice Beach drive-in restaurant from the clutches of a greedy oil baron who wants the land it sits on.

Cast
Dorothy Buhrman as Danielle
Sterling Frazier as Cupcake
Jillian Kesner as Angel
Anthony Mannino as Kong
Paul Ryan as Norman
Al Hobson as Carter Axe
Dick Miller as Jerry
Peter Liapis as Ron

Production
Rothman originally wrote the script, then entitled Carhops, while she was at Dimension Pictures. She took it with her when she left Dimension in 1975 and sold it to some producers, only to have them hire Barbara Peeters as the director instead. The movie was retitled due to the fact there was another film released with the same title. Rothman took her name off the movie, using a pseudonym (Dallas Meredith), as she felt "there was not an idea, a scene, a word, or even a comma left from my original script."

The drive-in was located on the northeast corner of Knox St. and N. Maclay Ave. The Masonic Lodge with its distinctive white pillars and square sign is still across the street.

References

External links

Starhops at TCMDB

1970s exploitation films
1978 films
American exploitation films
Films directed by Barbara Peeters
1970s English-language films
1970s American films